The 2011–12 season of the Bayernliga, the highest association football league in Bavaria, was the fourth season of the league at tier five (V) of the German football league system and the 67th season overall since establishment of the league in 1945. The regular season started on 22 July 2011 and finished after 34 rounds on 19 May 2012, followed by relegation play-off games in early June. It was the last season of the league operating in a single-division format, from 2012 it will be split into a northern and a southern division, a system last in place in the 1962–63 season.

The league season was interrupted by a three-month winter break, which lasted from 27 November 2011 to 2 March 2012. It was won by TSV 1860 Rosenheim, which clinched the title in the 33rd round of the season with a 3–0 home win over SV Seligenporten. It was the first time that the club from Rosenheim won the title. Apart from Rosenheim nine other clubs from the league earned promotion to the new Fußball-Regionalliga Bayern, while no club was relegated. This was because of the introduction of the Regionalliga Bayern as the new fourth tier above the Bayernliga from 2012 and the expansion to two regional divisions. Instead, the top nine clubs gained entry to the new Regionalliga while the next six had the opportunity to also qualify for this league, having to play a promotion round with the best teams of the Landesligas. The bottom three teams in the league automatically remained at this level.

Two of the leagues clubs made negative headlines when they encountered financial trouble. FSV Erlangen-Bruck averted insolvency in December 2011, caused by outstanding social security payments and wages, when it had to take up a €220,000 credit. The club announced that it would have to cut the budget of the football department. The TSV Aindling, club officials and current and former players were raided by the German customs department in December 2011. The club is thought to have knowingly withheld social security payments. A third club, TSV Gersthofen, announced a deficit of €200,000 for its football department, with the main club providing a 10-year repayable loan to cover for it. Aindling and Gersthofen consequently decided not to apply for a Regionalliga licence.

Qualifying modus for the 2012–13 season
In October 2010, another reform of the Regionalligas was decided upon. The number of leagues were now to be expanded to five, with the defunct Regionalliga Nordost to be reestablished and a Regionalliga Bayern to be established. The new system is due to come into operation in the 2012–13 season.

The Bavarian football federation was carrying out drastic changes to the league system from 2012 onwards. With the already decided introduction of the Regionalliga Bayern from 2012 to 2013, it placed two Bayernligas below the new league as the new fifth tier of the German league system. Below those, five Landesligas instead of the existing three were set, which were geographically divided to limit travel and increase the number of local derbies. This model was adopted in late April 2011. With the league reform at the end of the 2011–12 season, the Bezirksoberligas were also disbanded. Instead, the Bezirksligas took the place of the Bezirksoberligas once more below the Landesligas, as had been the case until 1988.

While it was originally thought that the Regionalliga Bayern would carry the name Bayernliga, it was later revealed that the current Bayernliga would retain this name, making it a divided league like it had already been from 1953 to 1963. The new qualification modus would see all current Bavarian Regionalliga teams qualify for the new league as well as the top nine of the Bayernliga. Additionally, the teams placed 10th to 15th entered a promotion round with the six Landesliga champions and runners-up for three more spots in the new league. Fluctuations of this formula were however possible if a Bavarian club was promoted to or relegated from the 3. Liga, which was not the case. The losers of this qualification round, nine clubs, and the Landesliga clubs placed third to eighth, 18 clubs, would all enter the new Bayernligas. The Landesliga clubs that failed to qualify for the Bayernligas would remain in one of the five new Landesligas, there would be no relegation to the Bezirksligas.

For the qualification round following the regular season this meant that the clubs placed first to ninth were directly qualified for the Regionalliga. The clubs placed tenth, eleventh and twelfth would each play one of the three Landesliga runners-up. The clubs placed 13th, 14th and 15th would each play one of the Landesliga champions. The winner of these six encounters would then advance to the next round. In this round, the winners of the first three encounters will be drawn against the winners of the second three. Depending on the number of teams entering the new Regionalliga from other leagues, all three winners of this round would qualify for the new league or further games will be necessary. All encounters were to be played in a two-game home and away format. However, since not all eligible clubs applied for a Regionalliga licence, this system was slightly altered.

The new two division Bayernliga will consist of all Bayernliga teams not qualified for the new Regionalliga plus a set number of teams qualified from the leagues below. The Landesliga champions and runners-up that failed to qualify for the Regionalliga would be directly qualified for the Bayernligas, as would the Landesliga teams placed third to eighth. The Landesliga teams placed ninth to 15th would face the seven Bezirksoberliga champions to determine the remaining available spots in the league. All match-ups will be played in European Cup format, meaning away goals count double when the aggregate score is drawn.

With the deadline for the licence applications for the new Regionalliga Bayern set for 1 April 2012, of the 18 Bayernliga clubs, 15 applied for a licence, with only TSV Gersthofen, TSV Aindling and SpVgg Unterhaching II deciding not to apply. Because of ongoing financial issues the FSV Erlangen-Bruck withdrew its Regionalliga licence application in April 2012, thereby giving one of the three Landesliga champions a bye in the first round of the Regionalliga qualification.

The league features four new clubs for the 2011–12 season:
 SB/DJK Rosenheim and TSV Gersthofen, promoted from the Landesliga Süd
 VfL Frohnlach, promoted from the Landesliga Nord
 SC Eltersdorf, promoted from the Landesliga Mitte

League table

Top goalscorers
The top goal scorers for the season:

Play-offs

Promotion round to the Regionalliga

First round
The following games were scheduled to determine which clubs from the Bayernliga and Landesliga who would qualify for the Regionalliga, to be played in a home-and-away format: The games of the first round were played on 23 and 26 May, the second round on 2 and 6 June 2012:

Second round
The winners of this round are qualified for the Regionalliga, the losers for the Bayernliga:

Promotion round to the Bayernliga

First round
The following games were scheduled to determine which clubs from the Landesliga and Bezirksoberliga qualify for the Bayernliga, to be played in a home-and-away format. The clubs were subdivided into seven regional groups. The games of the first round were played on 24 and 28 May, the second round on 3 and 7 June 2012:

Second round
The winners of this round are qualified for the Bayernliga, the losers for the Landesliga:

Key
 (B) denotes Bayernliga club
 (S) denotes Landesliga Süd club
 (M) denotes Landesliga Mitte club
 (N) denotes Landesliga Nord club
 (OF) denotes Bezirksoberliga Oberfranken club
 (UF) denotes Bezirksoberliga Unterfranken club
 (MF) denotes Bezirksoberliga Mittelfranken club
 (NB) denotes Bezirksoberliga Niederbayern club
 (OP) denotes Bezirksoberliga Oberpfalz club
 (OB) denotes Bezirksoberliga Oberbayern club
 (SW) denotes Bezirksoberliga Schwaben club

References

External links 
  of the Bavarian Football Association 
 Bayernliga 2011–12 on Fupa.net 
 Bayernliga 2011–12 on Weltfussball.de 
 Bayernliga 2011–12 at soccerway.com

2011-12
2011–12 Oberliga